Tokushige Noto (24 January 1902 – 4 January 1991) was a Japanese sprinter. He competed in the men's 400 metres, men's 800 metres, and the men's decathlon at the 1924 Summer Olympics.

References

External links
 

1902 births
1991 deaths
Place of birth missing
Japanese male sprinters
Japanese male middle-distance runners
Japanese decathletes
Olympic male sprinters
Olympic male middle-distance runners
Olympic decathletes
Olympic athletes of Japan
Athletes (track and field) at the 1924 Summer Olympics
Japan Championships in Athletics winners
20th-century Japanese people